Miguel David Gutiérrez Suárez (born ) is a Cuban volleyball player. He is part of the Cuba men's national volleyball team. On club level he plays for Volley Prata.

Sporting achievements

Clubs

CEV Challenge Cup
  2017/2018 – with Bunge Ravenna

References

External links
 profile at FIVB.org
 Player profile at Volleybox.net

1997 births
Living people
Cuban men's volleyball players
Place of birth missing (living people)
21st-century Cuban people